"The Understudy" is the 110th episode of the NBC sitcom Seinfeld. This is the 24th and final episode for the sixth season. It aired on May 18, 1995. This is the second episode in the series not to open with a stand-up routine (after the clip show episode "The Highlights of 100").

Plot
Jerry is dating Gennice Graham, the understudy of Bette Midler, who is starring in the stage musical adaptation of Rochelle Rochelle (the film first mentioned in "The Movie"). Gennice bursts into tears at the slightest thing, such as the film Beaches and dropping her hot dog, compelling Jerry to have to console her repeatedly.

During a charity softball game held in Central Park, George scores a run by charging into Midler at home plate after she insulted him during the game. She is sent to the hospital, enraging New Yorkers. Kramer, an ardent fan of Midler, helps nurse her back to health. Gennice takes over the lead role and believes they injured Midler for her. After being hounded by angry New Yorkers, Gennice cries once again; however, Jerry has had enough of consoling her and demands she stop acting childish over every little accident.

Elaine suspects her Korean manicurists are making fun of her in Korean, which in fact they are. When she learns that Frank Costanza is fluent in Korean, she brings him to the manicurists to eavesdrop. When he arrives, the manicurists start ridiculing both him and Elaine in Korean. Outraged, he begins haranguing them. They kick Elaine out for bringing "a spy", but allow Frank to remain. He reunites with one of the manicurists, Kim - an old flame who he met in Korea; they broke up because he would not take off his shoes upon entering her house. Despondent, Elaine wanders the streets in the rain, and meets J. Peterman. They hit it off and he hires her to work at his catalog. Frank takes Kim out and discusses their future in his car. When he uses his move on her, "stopping short", she gets angry and never wants to see him again, since stopping short is taboo in Korea.

George, Jerry, and Gennice visit the hospital to apologize to Bette Midler, but Kramer refuses to let them enter her room. Concerned about what Kramer might be doing to Midler, they go to summon a security guard. Kramer flees the scene, carting Midler along on her hospital bed. Upon returning home, Jerry hears Bette Midler's voice in Kramer's apartment but decides not to investigate.

At the premiere of the musical, Elaine brings along the Korean manicurists as an apology for "spying". However, when they learn that the lead role will be played by Gennice, not Bette Midler, they storm out and effectively sever Elaine from their boutique (leaving her despondent once again). When Gennice takes the stage, she has a problem with the laces on her boot and tearfully pleads that she be allowed to start over.

Production
A stand-up routine was filmed for the intro, but deleted before broadcast because the episode had run so far over the limit for its time slot.

Though it originated with writer Marjorie Gross contemplating what would happen if a celebrity were injured at one of the charity softball games Seinfeld creators Larry David and Jerry Seinfeld participated in, the Bette Midler/Gennice Graham story arc was developed into a parody of the 1994 Tonya Harding-Nancy Kerrigan scandal. Gennice's breakdown when her laces come undone references Harding's bootlace incident at the 1994 Olympics.

Jerry Stiller, who played the part of Frank Costanza, did not actually know any Korean; he learned his Korean lines phonetically. Frank's line "This is not my kind of guy", just as with "...we're gonna take it outside and I'm gonna show you what it's like!" from "The Opposite", was taken from a Buddy Rich bootleg tape. Larry David came up with the idea of Frank having a lost love working at the manicurists.

The character J. Peterman debuted in this episode. The J. Peterman Company catalogue was being delivered to the Seinfeld office, and David and Seinfeld, though they had no idea why the catalogue was being delivered to them, would leaf through it and were amused by the elaborate Hemingwayesque stories that were crafted into the catalogue's descriptions, inspiring them to create the character.

References

External links 
 

Seinfeld (season 6) episodes
1995 American television episodes